Sir George Middleton (1876 – 25 October 1938) was a Labour Party politician in the United Kingdom who served as Member of Parliament (MP) for Carlisle in the 1920s and 1930s. He was later a Church Estates Commissioner.

Born in Ramsey, Huntingdonshire, he started work at the Post Office, and became prominent in the Union of Post Office Workers, editing its magazine.

He unsuccessfully contested the Altrincham constituency at the 1918 general election.  He switched to Carlisle for the 1922 election, winning the seat from the sitting National Liberal MP. He was re-elected in 1923, but lost his seat at the 1924 general election. He regained the seat at the 1929 election, but was defeated again in 1931 and did not stand again.

In 1931 he replaced Sir Lewis Dibdin as First Church Estate Commissioner. He was knighted in 1935.

References

External links 
 

1876 births
1938 deaths
Labour Party (UK) MPs for English constituencies
UK MPs 1922–1923
UK MPs 1923–1924
UK MPs 1929–1931
Union of Communication Workers-sponsored MPs
Knights Bachelor
People from Ramsey, Cambridgeshire
Church Estates Commissioners
Date of birth missing